Richmond County is an historical county and census division of Nova Scotia, Canada. Local government is provided by the Municipality of the County of Richmond.

History
Named in honour of Charles Lennox, 4th Duke of Richmond, who was Governor General of British North America 1818-1819, Richmond County was created in 1835.

Richmond County comprises that territory known as the Southern District which was established in 1824 at the time of the dividing of Cape Breton Island into three districts. The boundaries of the Southern District were defined at the time of its establishment. Those same boundaries were determined to be the boundaries of Richmond County by statute in 1847.

The main centre is Arichat, located on Isle Madame.

Communities
Villages
St. Peter's

Reserves
Chapel Island 5

County municipality and county subdivisions
Municipality of the County of Richmond
Richmond, Subd. A
Richmond, Subd. B
Richmond, Subd. C

Access routes
Highways and numbered routes that run through the county, including external routes that start or finish at the county limits:

Highways

Trunk Routes

Collector Routes:

External Routes:
None

Demographics 

See also
 List of municipalities in Nova Scotia
Central Nova Tourist Association – Tourism Association Representing Colchester County.

References

External links

 Municipality of Richmond County Website